The following is a list of events affecting Tamil language television in 2022 from (India, Sri Lanka, Singapore and Tamil diaspora). Events listed include television show debuts, and finales; channel launches, and closures; stations changing or adding their network affiliations; and information about changes of ownership of channels or stations.

Events and New channels

October

December

Ongoing Series and Shows

New Series and Shows

Soap Operas

Shows

Debut Web Series

Ending Series and Shows

Soap Operas

Shows

Movie Premieres of 2022

January

February

March

April

May

June

July

August

September

October

November

December

Deaths

See also
 2023 in Tamil television

References

2022 in Tamil-language television